The filmography of actress Mare Winningham consists of her acting appearances in feature film, television series appearances, television films, and Winningham's stage credits.

With over 90 acting and stage credits to her name, Winningham is known for her role as Georgia Flood in the 1995 film Georgia, a role which she won the Independent Spirit Award for Best Supporting Female. She was nominated for the Academy Award for Best Supporting Actress for her role in the film, as well. Winningham has appeared in numerous television films and limited series since the 1970s. She has won two Primetime Emmy Awards for Outstanding Supporting Actress in a Miniseries or a Movie for her roles in Amber Waves (1980) and George Wallace (1997).

Her Broadway and off-Broadway stage performances, including Casa Valentina in 2014, have garnered Winningham critical acclaim. She has been nominated for a Drama Desk Award, a Tony Award, and won a Lucille Lortel Award in 2008.

Feature films

Television

Television films

Stage

See also
List of awards and nominations received by Mare Winningham

References

External links
 
 

Winningham, Mare
Winningham, Mare